Louis Linwood Voit III (born February 13, 1991) is an American professional baseball first baseman in the Milwaukee Brewers organization. He has previously played in Major League Baseball (MLB) for the New York Yankees, St. Louis Cardinals, San Diego Padres and Washington Nationals.

Voit played college baseball for the Missouri State Bears and made his MLB debut in 2017 with the Cardinals. He played for them in 2018 before being traded to the Yankees during the season. By 2019, he became the Yankees' starting first baseman and in 2020, he led MLB in home runs. In August 2022, Voit was traded with several prospects to the Washington Nationals for Juan Soto and Josh Bell.

Amateur career
Voit attended Lafayette High School in Wildwood, Missouri. He played for Lafayette's baseball team as a first baseman and third baseman in his first three years, and as a catcher in his senior year. He also played on their football team as a fullback and middle linebacker.

Voit received interest from NCAA Division I teams as a football player, but shoulder injuries ended his football career. The Kansas City Royals selected Voit in the 32nd round of the 2009 Major League Baseball draft, but he did not sign. Voit attended Missouri State University, where he played college baseball for the Missouri State Bears for four years.

In 2011, Voit played collegiate summer baseball with the Harwich Mariners of the Cape Cod Baseball League, and was named a league all-star. In 2012, his junior season, he batted .298 with six home runs and 46 runs batted in (RBIs) in 62 games. However, he tore the labrum in his right shoulder and went unselected in the 2012 MLB draft. As a senior in 2013, he played in 54 games, hitting .299 with two home runs and 30 RBIs. After his senior year, the St. Louis Cardinals selected Voit in the 22nd round of the 2013 Major League Baseball draft.

Professional career

St. Louis Cardinals

Voit started his professional career as a catcher with the State College Spikes of the Class A-Short Season New York-Penn League. He spent all of 2013 there, batting .242 with two home runs and 16 runs batted in (RBIs) in 46 games played. He moved to first base in 2014 and played that season with the Palm Beach Cardinals of the Class A-Advanced Florida State League, where he batted .276 with nine home runs and 51 RBIs in 93 games. He returned to Palm Beach in 2015, compiling a .273 batting average with 11 home runs and 77 RBIs in 130 games. Voit spent 2016 with the Springfield Cardinals of the Class AA Texas League, where he slashed .297/.372/.477 with 19 home runs and 74 RBIs in 134 games. Voit started 2017 with the Memphis Redbirds of the Class AAA Pacific Coast League.

2017
On June 25, 2017, the Cardinals promoted Voit to the major leagues. In 70 games for Memphis prior to his promotion, he was batting .322 with 12 home runs and 48 RBIs.

He debuted against the Pittsburgh Pirates on the same night of his call-up and reached base after being hit by a pitch. Voit started the next day against the Cincinnati Reds and doubled off of Austin Brice for his first major league hit in an 8–2 win. On July 3, he hit his first major league home run. In 114 at-bats for St. Louis in 2017, Voit batted .246 with four home runs, 18 RBIs, and a .736 OPS (on-base plus slugging).

New York Yankees

2018

On July 27, 2018, the Cardinals traded Voit, along with bonus pool money, to the New York Yankees for Chasen Shreve and Giovanny Gallegos. The Yankees assigned Voit to the Scranton/Wilkes-Barre RailRiders of the Class AAA International League and promoted him to the major leagues on August 2. After he batted 3-for-16 (.188) in five games, the Yankees sent Voit back to Scranton/Wilkes-Barre on August 13. In his next seven games with the RailRiders, Voit batted 8-for-22 (.364). After Didi Gregorius was placed on the 10-day disabled list on August 21, Voit was called back up.

Voit took over the Yankees starting first baseman job from Greg Bird. He hit his tenth home run for the Yankees on September 20, becoming the twelfth player on the Yankees to hit 10 home runs during 2018. When Voit reached the 10-homer mark, the Yankees set a new major league team record for most players on one team with 10 or more home runs in a season. Voit was named American League's (AL) Player of the Week on October 1 after hitting .458 with three home runs and eight runs batted in during the previous week. In 2018, Voit batted .333 with 14 home runs, 33 RBIs and a 1.095 OPS (on base plus slugging) in 39 games for the Yankees.

Voit started at first base for the Yankees in the 2018 AL Wild Card Game. In the sixth inning, he hit a two-run triple off of Blake Treinen (the first triple of his career) to help the Yankees win, 7-2.

2019
On April 29, 2019, Voit was named the AL Player of the Week, after hitting .433 with 13 hits, four home runs and 10 RBIs for the previous week. He went on the injured list with an abdominal injury on June 29 and was activated on August 29. In 2019, Voit batted .263/.378/.464. He made contact with the lowest percentage of pitches he swung at outside the strike zone (44.2%) of all major leaguers. After the season, Voit underwent bilateral core muscle surgery.

After the signing of Gerrit Cole, Voit announced on Twitter he would change his number from No. 45 to No 59, in honor of his brother, so that Cole could wear No. 45.

2020
Voit was the starting first baseman for the Yankees on Opening Day 2020. He hit his first career major league grand slam on July 30, 2020 in the Yankees' 8-6 win over Baltimore. On September 17, Voit hit his 20th home run of the season in the Yankees' 50th game, making him just the third player in franchise history to reach 20 home runs in the team's first 50 games after Babe Ruth and Mickey Mantle. Voit's home run also came in the same inning that the Yankees hit five home runs, setting a new franchise record and tying a major league record.

Voit ended the season with 22 home runs, leading the major leagues. He and Yankees teammate DJ LeMahieu, who led MLB with a .364 average, became the first pair of teammates to lead MLB in home runs and batting average since 1959.

2021
On March 27, 2021, it was announced that Voit had torn his meniscus in one of his knees and required surgery. He began the 2021 season on the 10-day injured list. After a rehab assignment with Triple-A Scranton/Wilkes Barre, Voit was activated on May 11, 2021. On June 23, Voit hit his first career walk-off hit, an RBI single that scored Tyler Wade to beat the Kansas City Royals 6–5.

On July 6, Voit had his first career five-hit game, going 5-for-6 with four singles, a double, three RBIs and scoring a run during a 12–1 win against the Seattle Mariners. Voit continued to be limited by injuries, leading the Yankees to acquire first baseman Anthony Rizzo at the 2021 trade deadline. Voit appeared in 68 games during the 2021 season, hitting 11 home runs in 213 at bats.

San Diego Padres
Days after the Yankees re-signed Rizzo, the Yankees traded Voit to the San Diego Padres for Justin Lange on March 18, 2022. On April 19, 2022, after he collided with Tommy Pham's teammate Tyler Stephenson at home plate while unsuccessfully trying to score, Pham offered to fight Voit.

Washington Nationals

On August 2, 2022, the Padres traded Voit, CJ Abrams, MacKenzie Gore, Robert Hassell, James Wood, and Jarlín Susana to the Washington Nationals in exchange for Juan Soto and Josh Bell. The trade originally had Eric Hosmer go to the Nationals instead of Voit, but Hosmer invoked his no-trade clause, and Voit was traded to Washington instead.

In 2022, Voit batted .226/.308/.402 with 179 strikeouts in 500 at bats, had the highest swinging strike percentage in the majors at 18.7%, had the lowest contact percentage with pitches thrown to him of all major leaguers at 64.0%, and when swinging at pitches outside the strike zone he made contact 46.1% of the time, the lowest percentage in the major leagues.

On November 18, Voit was non-tendered and became a free agent.

Milwaukee Brewers
On February 21, 2023, Voit signed a one year minor league contract with the Milwaukee Brewers organization with an invitation to their spring training.

Personal life
Voit became engaged to Victoria Rigman in October 2017, and they married in 2018. The couple welcomed a daughter on May 28, 2021. His younger brother, John, played defensive tackle for the Army Black Knights football team.

References

External links

Missouri State Bears bio

1991 births
Baseball players from Missouri
Harwich Mariners players
Liga de Béisbol Profesional Roberto Clemente infielders
Living people
Major League Baseball first basemen
American League home run champions
Memphis Redbirds players
Missouri State Bears baseball players
New York Yankees players
Palm Beach Cardinals players
San Diego Padres players
Scranton/Wilkes-Barre RailRiders players
Sportspeople from St. Louis County, Missouri
Springfield Cardinals players
St. Louis Cardinals players
State College Spikes players
Tiburones de Aguadilla players
Washington Nationals players